The 1981 All-Big Ten Conference football team consists of American football players chosen by various organizations for All-Big Ten Conference teams for the 1981 college football season.  Two players were unanimous first-team selections by the Associated Press (AP) media panel: Butch Woolfolk of Michigan and Tim Krumrie of Wisconsin.  Three players missed being unanimous AP selections by one vote Anthony Carter of Michigan and Reggie Roby and Andre Tippett of Iowa.

Offensive selections

Quarterbacks
 Tony Eason, Illinois (AP-1; UPI-2)
 Art Schlichter, Ohio State (AP-2; UPI-1)

Running backs
 Butch Woolfolk, Michigan (AP-1; UPI-1)
 Tim Spencer, Ohio State (AP-1; UPI-2)
 Dave Mohapp, Wisconsin (AP-2; UPI-1)
 Stan Edwards, Michigan (AP-2; UPI-2)

Wide receivers
 Steve Bryant, Purdue (AP-1; UPI-1)
 Anthony Carter, Michigan (AP-1; UPI-1)
 Oliver Williams, Illinois (AP-2)
 Chester Cooper, Minnesota (AP-2)
 Dwayne Gunn, Indiana (UPI-2)
 Gary Williams, Ohio State (UPI-2)

Tight ends
 Bob Stephenson, Indiana (AP-1; UPI-1)
 John E. Frank, Ohio State (AP-2)
 Norm Betts, Michigan (UPI-2)

Centers
 Tom Piette, Michigan State (AP-2; UPI-1)
 Greg Boeke, Illinois (AP-1)
 Ron Versnik, Wisconsin (UPI-2)

Guards
 Kurt Becker, Michigan (AP-1; UPI-1)
 Joe Lukens, Ohio State (AP-1; UPI-2)
 Ron Hallstrom, Iowa (AP-2; UPI-1)
 Mike Carrington, Illinois (AP-2)
 Bill Humphries, Minnesota (UPI-2)

Tackles
 Ed Muransky, Michigan (AP-1; UPI-1)
 Bubba Paris, Michigan (AP-1; UPI-2)
 Ken Dallafior, Minnesota (AP-2; UPI-1)
 Bob Winckler, Wisconsin (AP-2)
 Tom Jelesky, Purdue (UPI-2)

Defensive selections

Defensive linemen
 Tim Krumrie, Wisconsin (AP-1; UPI-1)
 Andre Tippett, Iowa (AP-1; UPI-1)
 Pat Dean, Iowa (AP-1; UPI-1)
 Mark Bortz, Iowa (AP-1; UPI-2)
 Jerome Foster, Ohio State (AP-2; UPI-1)

 Karl Mecklenburg, Minnesota (AP-2; UPI-2)
 Mark Butkus, Illinois (AP-2)
 Mark Shumate, Wisconsin (AP-2)
 Robert Thompson, Michigan (UPI-2)
 Fred Orgas, Minnesota (UPI-2)

Linebackers
 Mel Cole, Iowa (AP-1; UPI-1)
 Jim Fahnhorst, Minnesota (AP-1; UPI-1)
 Marcus Marek, Ohio State (AP-1; UPI-1)
 Carl Banks, Michigan State (AP-2; UPI-1)
 Brock Spack, Purdue (AP-1)
 Dave Levenick, Wisconsin (AP-2; UPI-2)
 Jack Squirek, Illinois (AP-2; UPI-2)
 Paul Girgash, Michigan (AP-2)
 Glenn Cobb, Ohio State (UPI-2)
 Todd Simonsen, Iowa (UPI-2)

Defensive backs
 David Greenwood, Wisconsin (AP-1; UPI-1)
 Matt Vanden Boom, Wisconsin (AP-1; UPI-1)
 Jim Burroughs, Michigan State (AP-2; UPI-1)
 Lou King, Iowa (AP-1)
 Keith Bostic, Michigan (AP-2; UPI-2)
 Tony Jackson, Michigan (AP-2; UPI-2)
 Brian Carpenter, Michigan (UPI-2)

Special teams

Placekicker
 Morten Andersen, Michigan State (AP-1; UPI-1)
 Bob Atha, Ohio State (AP-2; UPI-2)

Punter
 Reggie Roby, Iowa (AP-1; UPI-1)
 Don Bracken, Michigan (AP-2; UPI-2)

Key

See also
1981 College Football All-America Team

References

All-Big Ten Conference
All-Big Ten Conference football teams